Happy Home is a 2016 South Korean television series starring Kim Yeong-cheol, Won Mi-kyung, Kim So-yeon, Lee Sang-woo and Lee Pil-mo. It aired on MBC every Saturdays to Sundays at 20:45 (KST) for 51 episodes from February 27 to August 21, 2016.

Cast

Main cast
Kim Yeong-cheol as Bong Sam-bong
 as child Sam-bong
Park Hoon as young Sam-bong
Won Mi-kyung as Bae Sook-nyeo
 as young Sook-nyeo
Kim So-yeon as Bong Hae-ryung
Lee Sang-woo as Seo Ji-geon
Lee Pil-mo as Yoo Hyun-gi

Bong's family
Kim Ji-ho as Han Mi-soon
Jang In-sub as Bong Man-ho
Choi Yoon-so as Bong Hae-won
 as Bong Sam-sook
Song hee-soo as child Sam-sook
Yoon Da-hoon as Bong Sam-sik
Park Seung-joon as child Sam-sik
 as Oh Min-jeong
 as Bong Jin-hwa
Kim Sa-rang as Bong Seon-hwa
Yoon Seok-ho as Bong Sam-goo

People around Seo Ji-geon
 as Seo Do-hyung
Jeon Jin-seo as Seo Young-woo
Park Min-woo as Lee Kang-min
Park Ji-il as Lee Seok-ho
Seo Kyung-hwa as Kim In-sook

People around Yoo Hyun-gi
Seo Yi-sook as Jang Kyung-ok
 as Lee Young-eun

Happy Home
Yoon Jin-yi as Joo Se-ri
Ahn Hyo-seop as Choi Cheol-soo / Kang Joon-young

 as Hong Ji-sook
 as Ahn Cho-rong

Extended cast

 as Ahn Mi-na
Ahn Nae-sang as Kim Min-seok

 as Ji Soo (Yoo Hyun-gi's blind date)
Seo Young-tak as Ji Soo's father
 as female reporter

 as section head Kim Sung-hoon
Kim Jeong-soo as Bae Sook-nyeo's boxing trainer

Gil Jeong-woo as Yoo Seo-jin

Seo Bo-ik

Jeon Hae-ryong

Ahn Sung-geon
Kwon Hong-seok
Bae Gi-beom

Yoo Geum

Min Dae-sik
Joo Boo-jin
Lee Dal

Lee Woong-hee

Yoo Pil-ran
Song Kyung-hwa

Goo Bon-seok
Ham Jin-sung
Cha Sang-mi
Son Jeong-rim
 as elementary school's director
Choi Han-byul

Kwon Tae-jin
Kim Hyun

Jang Moon-gyu

Lee Hyung-goo
Choi Young-jin
Jung Young-do
Choi Seo-hoo
Kang Chan-yang
Kwon Oh-soo
Byun Geon-woo
Geum Gwang-san
Dang Hyun-seok

Kim Tae-rang

Yoo Ok-joo
Moon Ah-ram
Lee Byung-cheol
Park Byung-wook
Kim Woo-hyuk as Kim Jin-young
Ahn Gi-young
Eun Seo-yool
Seok Bo-bae
Im Se-won

Cameo appearances
Daniel Lindemann as German customer

Ratings
In the table below, the blue numbers represent the lowest ratings and the red numbers represent the highest ratings.

Original soundtracks

OST Part 1

OST Part 2

OST Part 3

OST Part 4

OST Part 5

OST Part 6

Awards and nominations

Notes

References

External links
  
 
 
 Production website
 Happy Home Vietnam

2016 South Korean television series debuts
2016 South Korean television series endings
MBC TV television dramas
Korean-language television shows
Television series by Mega Monster